Decatur House is a historic house museum at 748 Jackson Place in Washington, D.C., the capital of the United States. It is named after its first owner and occupant Stephen Decatur. A museum, it now serves as the National Center for White House History, managed by the White House Historical Association.

History
Decatur House is one of the oldest surviving homes in Washington, D.C., and one of only three remaining houses in the country designed by neoclassical architect Benjamin Henry Latrobe.  Completed in 1818 for naval hero Stephen Decatur and his wife, Susan, the Federal Style house is prominently located across Lafayette Square from the White House. It was successively home to Henry Clay, Martin Van Buren and Edward Livingston, who collectively made Decatur House the unofficial residence of the Secretary of State from 1827 to 1833, each renting the house while they served in that post.

In 1836 John Gadsby and his wife Providence moved into the house and brought their house slaves.  They built a two-story structure at the back which became the slave quarters for those workers, who previously lived in the main house.  This structure remains as one of the few examples of slave quarters in urban areas.  It is physical evidence of African Americans having been held "in bondage in sight of the White House."

Following John Gadsby's death, the home was again rented to a series of prominent tenants. In order, these tenants were Vice President George M. Dallas, publisher and former Mayor of Washington Joseph Gales, Congressmen and brothers John A. King and James G. King, Rep. William Appleton, Speaker of the House James Lawrence Orr and Sen. Judah Benjamin. During the Civil War it was used as Army offices and then it sat empty for six years.

Decatur House was purchased in 1872 by Edward Fitzgerald Beale, a frontiersman and explorer who later became a rancher and diplomat. Beale's daughter-in-law, Marie, bequeathed Decatur House to the National Trust for Historic Preservation in 1956.  The house was designated a U.S. National Historic Landmark in 1976.

Decatur House, now a museum, is located at 748 Jackson Place, N.W., on President's Park (Lafayette Park). The lower floor is kept in the style of the early 19th century while the upper floor shows more modern renovations of the early 20th century.

Because of the centrality of its location, the status of its residents, and the fact that urban slaves worked there across from the White House, the house now contains more material interpreting African American history.  Among the stories is that of Charlotte Dupuy, who in 1829 sued her master Henry Clay, then Secretary of State, for her freedom and that of her two children. While she lost her court case, Clay finally freed Dupuy and her daughter in 1840, and her son in 1844.  A special exhibit on African American history through 1965 has recently been added to the museum and its website.

References

External links
 Decatur House on Lafayette Square: Washington, DC
 Listing at the National Park Service
 Decatur House: A Home of the Rich and Powerful, a National Park Service Teaching with Historic Places (TwHP) lesson plan

National Historic Landmarks in Washington, D.C.
Houses completed in 1818
Houses on the National Register of Historic Places in Washington, D.C.
Benjamin Henry Latrobe buildings and structures
Federal architecture in Washington, D.C.
African-American museums in Washington, D.C.
Historic house museums in Washington, D.C.
Slave cabins and quarters in the United States